Pauline of Württemberg may refer to several different members of Württemberg royalty:

Pauline Therese of Württemberg (1800–1873), daughter of Duke Louis of Württemberg and third wife of King William I of Württemberg
Princess Pauline of Württemberg (1810–1856), daughter of Prince Paul of Württemberg and second wife of William, Duke of Nassau
Princess Pauline of Württemberg (1877–1965), daughter of William II of Württemberg and wife of William Frederick, Prince of Wied